Couzens Bay is an ice-filled bay about  long, entered between Senia Point and Cape Goldschmidt on the western side of the Ross Ice Shelf. It was named by the New Zealand Geological Survey Antarctic Expedition (1960–61) for Lieutenant Thomas Couzens, Royal New Zealand Air Force, who lost his life in a crevasse accident near Cape Selborne on November 19, 1959.

References 

Bays of the Ross Dependency
Shackleton Coast